The 2019 Torbay Council election took place on 2 May 2019 to elect members of Torbay Council in England. This was on the same day as other local elections. The Conservatives lost the council to no overall control.

Results summary

Election result

|-

Results by ward
A * denotes an incumbent.

Barton with Watcombe

Churston with Galmpton

Clifton with Maidenway

Cockington with Chelston

Collaton St Mary

Ellacombe

Furzeham with Summercombe

Goodrington with Roselands

King's Ash

Preston

Roundham with Hyde

Shiphay

St Marychurch

St Peters with St Marys

Tormohun

Wellswood

By-elections

Goodrington with Roselands
The by-election was held on 14 November 2019, following the resignation of Councillor Rick Heyse.

Clifton with Maidenway
The by-election was held on 6 May 2021, following the death of Councillor Ian Doggett.

References 

Torbay Council elections
Torbay
May 2019 events in the United Kingdom
2010s in Devon